The 1st constituency of the Rhône (French: Première circonscription du Rhône) is a French legislative constituency in the Rhône département. Like the other 576 French constituencies, it elects one MP using a two round electoral system.

Description

The 1st constituency of the Rhône includes western parts of a number of Cantons of Lyon . It is an urban seat in France's second largest city. Since 2015 this constituency has been part of the Lyon Metropolis and therefore outside of the Rhône for administrative purposes.

The seat was, until 2012, a stronghold of the centre right when it fell to Thierry Braillard of the PRG. It subsequently was captured by En Marche! in 2017.

Assembly Members

Election results

2022

 
 
 
 
 
|-
| colspan="8" bgcolor="#E9E9E9"|
|-
 
 

 
 
 
 
 
* Dayme ran as a dissident member of LREM without the support of the party or the Ensemble Citoyens alliance.

2017

 
 
 
 
 
 
|-
| colspan="8" bgcolor="#E9E9E9"|
|-

2012

 
 
 
 
 
 
|-
| colspan="8" bgcolor="#E9E9E9"|
|-

2007

 
 
 
 
 
 
 
|-
| colspan="8" bgcolor="#E9E9E9"|
|-

2002

 
 
 
 
 
|-
| colspan="8" bgcolor="#E9E9E9"|
|-

1997

 
 
 
 
 
 
 
 
|-
| colspan="8" bgcolor="#E9E9E9"|
|-

References

1